Laurence Kirkpatrick is an ordained Presbyterian minister and historian, and a former professor of church history.

Early life
Laurence Kirkpatrick was born in 1956.  He studied ancient history, Semitic studies and theology at Queen’s University Belfast, followed by study of early church history at the University of Glasgow. He was ordained as a minister by the Presbyterian Church in Ireland in 1982.

Ministerial and academic career
Prior to his appointment as Professor of Church History at Union Theological College in 1996, he was minister of Muckamore Presbyterian Church for twelve years. He served as Secretary of Faculty at Union Theological College (1998-2007), Advisor of Studies at Queen’s University Belfast (2000-07) and as Chair of the Practical Theology, Systematic Theology and Church History Subject Board of the Queen's University Institute of Theology. He delivered numerous public lectures, including the Robert Allen Lecture on Theological Education, the Carey Lectures on Irish Presbyterian Mission to Manchuria, multiple community events marking the 400th Anniversary of the publication of the King James Bible, and the Comber Titanic Centenary Lecture in April 2012. 

Kirkpatrick also edited the papers of the 1912 Ulster Covenant and Citizenship Conference in April 2012, as well as co-organising the Calvin Anniversary Conference at Union Theological College in September 2009. His book entitled Presbyterians in Ireland – An Illustrated History presented a history of the Presbyterian Church in Ireland, together with brief histories of each presbytery and many brief biographical sketches. He contributed A brief guide to Luther as the Presbyterian Church in Ireland celebrated the 500th anniversary of the Reformation in October 2017. He also worked as a chaplain in Muckamore Abbey Hospital from 1985 until his dismissal in 2018.

Controversy
Professor Kirkpatrick was suspended from teaching at Union Theological College in 2018, largely in response to remarks on BBC Radio Ulster's Talkback programme, for which he was subsequently dismissed by the college in 2019, after 22 teaching years, as aspects of his radio interview were judged to constitute "gross misconduct".  Specifically, a disciplinary panel held that a statement about same-sex relationships which was not aligned with the doctrinal position of the professor's employer was a serious breach of discipline, as was a failure to defend the college's reputation when its link to Queen's University Belfast was questioned. The dismissal attracted international attention.

References 

Presbyterian ministers from Northern Ireland
Historians of Christianity

1965 births
Living people